Mina Totino (born 1949) is a Canadian painter currently based in Vancouver, British Columbia. Totino's work has appeared in solo and group exhibitions in Montreal, Toronto and Berlin. She first came to prominence in the 1985 Young Romantics exhibition at the Vancouver Art Gallery. Totino's work is informed by contemporary criticism, especially literary and film criticism that have analyzed the position of the imaginary spectator.

Life and education 
Mina Totino was born in Greater Sudbury, Ontario. She obtained her BFA from Emily Carr Institute of Art and Design in 1982.

Solo exhibitions 
Charles H. Scott Gallery, 2010
Mina Totino, Morris and Helen Belkin Art Gallery, 1997
Mina Totino – PAINTINGS, Contemporary Art Gallery, 1994

Group exhibitions 

Vancouver Special: Ambivalent Pleasures, Vancouver Art Gallery, 2017
Readymades, Gordon Smith Gallery of Canadian Art, 2016
Young Romantics, Vancouver Art Gallery, 1995

Curatorial work 
In 2014, Mina Totino curated Persian Rose Chartreuse Muse Vancouver Grey at Equinox Gallery, Vancouver, BC. The exhibition proved significant in marking shifting attitudes and discussions around painting and abstraction.

Writings 
Mina Totino has an artist book, I Look Up, Volume One, 1997 – 2000, co-published by Charles H. Scott Gallery and Publication Studio Vancouver.

Awards 
Mina Totino alongside Skeena Reece received the Jack and Doris Shadbolt Foundation VIVA awards on April 11, 2014.

Collections 
Mina Totino's work is found in the collections of the Walter Phillips Gallery, Banff, AB; the Vancouver Art Gallery; and the Morris and Helen Belkin Art Gallery, Vancouver, BC.

References 

Canadian women painters
1949 births
20th-century Canadian painters
Living people
21st-century Canadian painters
People from Greater Sudbury
Artists from Ontario
Emily Carr University of Art and Design alumni
Artists from Vancouver
20th-century Canadian women artists
21st-century Canadian women artists